Dennis Gabor  (5 June 1900 – 9 February 1979) was a Hungarian-British electrical engineer and physicist, most notable for inventing holography, for which he later received the 1971 Nobel Prize in Physics. He obtained British citizenship in 1934, and spent most of his life in England.

Life and career 
Gabor was born as Günszberg Dénes, into a Jewish family in Budapest, Hungary. In 1918, his family converted to Lutheranism. Dennis was the first-born son of Günszberg Bernát and Jakobovits Adél. Despite having a religious background, religion played a minor role in his later life and he considered himself agnostic. In 1902, the family received permission to change their surname from Günszberg to Gábor. He served with the Hungarian artillery in northern Italy during World War I. He began his studies in engineering at the Technical University of Budapest in 1918, later in Germany, at the Charlottenburg Technical University in Berlin, now known as the Technical University of Berlin. At the start of his career, he analysed the properties of high voltage electric transmission lines by using cathode-beam oscillographs, which led to his interest in electron optics. Studying the fundamental processes of the oscillograph, Gabor was led to other electron-beam devices such as electron microscopes and TV tubes. He eventually wrote his PhD thesis on Recording of Transients in Electric Circuits with the Cathode Ray Oscillograph in 1927, and worked on plasma lamps.

In 1933 Gabor fled from Nazi Germany, where he was considered Jewish, and was invited to Britain to work at the development department of the British Thomson-Houston company in Rugby, Warwickshire. During his time in Rugby, he met Marjorie Louise Butler, and they married in 1936. He became a British citizen in 1946, and it was while working at British Thomson-Houston that he invented holography, in 1947.
He experimented with a heavily filtered mercury arc light source. However, the earliest hologram was only realised in 1964 following the 1960 invention of the laser, the first coherent light source. After this, holography became commercially available.

Gabor's research focused on electron inputs and outputs, which led him to the invention of re-holography. The basic idea was that for perfect optical imaging, the total of all the information has to be used; not only the amplitude, as in usual optical imaging, but also the phase. In this manner a complete holo-spatial picture can be obtained. Gabor published his theories of re-holography in a series of papers between 1946 and 1951.

Gabor also researched how human beings communicate and hear; the result of his investigations was the theory of granular synthesis, although Greek composer Iannis Xenakis claimed that he was actually the first inventor of this synthesis technique. Gabor's work in this and related areas was foundational in the development of time–frequency analysis.

In 1948 Gabor moved from Rugby to Imperial College London, and in 1958 became professor of Applied Physics until his retirement in 1967. His inaugural lecture on 3 March 1959, 'Electronic Inventions and their Impact on Civilisation' provided inspiration for Norbert Wiener's treatment of self-reproducing machines in the penultimate chapter in the 1961 edition of his book Cybernetics.

In 1963 Gabor published Inventing the Future which discussed the three major threats Gabor saw to modern society: war, overpopulation and the Age of Leisure. The book contained the now well-known expression that "the future cannot be predicted, but futures can be invented." Reviewer Nigel Calder described his concept as, "His basic approach is that we cannot predict the future, but we can invent it..." Others such as Alan Kay, Peter Drucker, and Forrest Shaklee have used various forms of similar quotes. His next book, Innovations: scientific, technological, and social which was published in 1970, expanded on some of the topics he had already earlier touched upon, and also pointed to his interest in technological innovation as mechanism of both liberation and destruction.

In 1971 he was the single recipient of the Nobel Prize in Physics with the motivation "for his invention and development of the holographic method" and presented the history of the development of holography from 1948 in his Nobel lecture.

While spending much of his retirement in Italy at Lavinio Rome, he remained connected with Imperial College as a senior research fellow and also became staff scientist of CBS Laboratories, in Stamford, Connecticut; there, he collaborated with his lifelong friend, CBS Labs' president Dr. Peter C. Goldmark in many new schemes of communication and display. One of Imperial College's new halls of residence in Prince's Gardens, Knightsbridge is named Gabor Hall in honour of Gabor's contribution to Imperial College. He developed an interest in social analysis and published The Mature Society: a view of the future in 1972. He also joined the Club of Rome and supervised a working group studying energy sources and technical change. The findings of this group was published in the report Beyond the Age of Waste in 1978, a report which was an early warning of several issues that only later received widespread attention.

Following the rapid development of lasers and a wide variety of holographic applications (e.g., art, information storage, and the recognition of patterns), Gabor achieved acknowledged success and worldwide attention during his lifetime. He received numerous awards besides the Nobel Prize.

Gabor died in a nursing home in South Kensington, London, on 9 February 1979.  In 2006 a blue plaque was put up on No. 79 Queen's Gate in Kensington, where he lived from 1949 until the early 1960s.

Personal life
On 8 August 1936 he married Marjorie Louise Butler with whom he lived in a harmonious marriage. They did not have any children.

Publications
The Electron Microscope (1934)
Inventing the Future (1963)
Innovations: Scientific, Technological, and Social (1970)
The Mature Society (1972)
Proper Propertities of Science and Technology (1972)
Beyond the Age of Waste: A Report to the Club of Rome (1979, with U. Colombo, A. King en R. Galli)

Awards and honors 

1956 – Elected a Fellow of the Royal Society (FRS)
1964 – Honorary Member of the Hungarian Academy of Sciences
1964 – D.Sc., University of London
1967 – Young Medal and Prize, for distinguished research in the field of optics
1967 – Columbus Award of the International Institute for Communications, Genoa
1968 – The first Albert A. Michelson Medal from The Franklin Institute, Philadelphia
1968 – Rumford Medal of the Royal Society
1970 – Honorary Doctorate, University of Southampton
1970 – Medal of Honor of the Institute of Electrical and Electronics Engineers
1970 – Commander of the Order of the British Empire (CBE)
1971 – Nobel Prize in Physics, for his invention and development of the holographic method
1971 – Honorary Doctorate, Delft University of Technology
1972 – Holweck Prize of the Société Française de Physique
1983 – the International Society for Optical Engineering (SPIE) established the annual Dennis Gabor Award, "in recognition of outstanding accomplishments in diffractive wavefront technologies, especially those which further the development of holography and metrology applications."
1989 – the Royal Society of London began issuing the Gabor Medal for "acknowledged distinction of interdisciplinary work between the life sciences with other disciplines".
1992 – Gábor Dénes College in Budapest, Hungary, is named after Gabor. 
1993 – the NOVOFER Foundation of the Hungarian Academy of Sciences established its annual International Dennis Gabor Award, for outstanding young scientists researching in the fields of physics and applied technology.
2000 – the asteroid 72071 Gábor is named after Gabor.
 2008 – the Institute of Physics renamed its Duddell Medal and Prize, established in 1923, into the Dennis Gabor Medal and Prize.
 2009 – Imperial College London opened the Gabor Hall.
 Dennis-Gabor-Straße in Potsdam is named in his honour and is the location of the Potsdamer Centrum für Technologie.

In popular culture 
 On 5 June 2010, the logo for the Google website was drawn to resemble a hologram in honour of Dennis Gabor's 110th birthday.
 In David Foster Wallace's Infinite Jest, Hal suggests that "Dennis Gabor may very well have been the Antichrist."

See also
 Adaptive Gabor representation
 Gabor expansion
 Gabor frame
 Microsound
 Meniscus corrector
 Gábor Dénes College

References

External links 

  including the Nobel Lecture, 11 December 1970 Magnetism and the Local Molecular Field
 Nobel Prize presentation speech by Professor Erik Ingelstam of the Royal Swedish Academy of Sciences
 

1900 births
1979 deaths
Nobel laureates in Physics
British Nobel laureates
Hungarian Nobel laureates
Austro-Hungarian Nobel laureates
Academics of Imperial College London
Technical University of Berlin alumni
Academic staff of the Technical University of Berlin
British agnostics
British electrical engineers
20th-century British inventors
British Lutherans
British Jews
20th-century British physicists
Naturalised citizens of the United Kingdom
Commanders of the Order of the British Empire
Fellows of the Royal Society
Foreign associates of the National Academy of Sciences
Futurologists
Hungarian agnostics
Hungarian electrical engineers
Hungarian emigrants to England
20th-century Hungarian inventors
Hungarian Jews
Hungarian refugees
20th-century Hungarian physicists
Members of the Hungarian Academy of Sciences
IEEE Medal of Honor recipients
Jews who immigrated to the United Kingdom to escape Nazism
Jewish agnostics
Jewish engineers
Jewish physicists
People from Pest, Hungary
Hungarian emigrants to Germany
Converts to Christianity from Judaism
Optical engineers